Saman Safa (born September 12, 1984) is an Iranian football player. He most recently plays for the Iran's Premier Football League club Foolad as a goalkeeper.

Club career
A product of the Pas Tehran’s youth system, Safa was drafted into the first team for the IPL 2006/07 season. At the end of the season as Pas F.C. officially dissolved, he moved to PAS Hamedan.

Club career statistics
Last Update: 3 August 2011

References

1984 births
Living people
Pas players
Sanat Mes Kerman F.C. players
Foolad FC players
Persian Gulf Pro League players
Iranian footballers
Association football goalkeepers